and Chuy is an American animated television series created by Alfonso Amey and Keu Reyes. The series premiered November 8, 2007 on the LATV Network. On June 12, 2008, the series began airing on Mun2.

Characters
 and Chuy are a couple of animated hosts of a music video show on LATV. The pair watch and critique music videos as they are being shown. Ceasar and Chuy have ongoing hilarious stories throughout the episodes, and they touch on serious issues ranging from Global Warming to the state of education; all of course, from their unique perspective.

 and Chuy attend the East City Vocational Junior College and they interact with other characters in that setting. One of them being Keel Whitay, a professor, and others include their classmates, Jerome, Rosario, and Dhat Ho.  and Chuy's family names or age are never mentioned on the show, but it is presumed they are in the range of 18 to 24 years old.

Recurring themes
The series has a number of recurring elements.
  and Chuy work at LATV and broadcast their show live from the station's studio. They spend most of their time watching and critiquing music videos. Chuy has quit the show on several occasions to pursuit other interests, only to come back and beg for his job with shame.
  and Chuy have started many debates at school, often dividing the class into groups that disagree. Some of the debates have included the correct way to use language, and the Iraq war.
 One of Chuy's life goals is to become rich and he plans to achieve this by any means necessary.  is in a constant position to either talk Chuy out of engaging in destructive schemes, or cleaning up after Chuy has already ruined something because of such feat.
 Chuy has a fascination and obsession over Pirates. He has been known to sometimes become a Pirate and randomly yell "Pirate, argh!".

Episodes

Holiday specials
 and Chuy have not yet featured Holiday specials, but Halloween and Christmas episodes are said to be in the works.

Music videos
One of the key elements of the program is the inclusion of music videos, and their ruthless and irreverent critique of the artists and music featured on the videos, à la Beavis and Butt-head. Nothing is sacred: the performer, lyrics, or the production in general.

Criticism
The critiques of the music video are often censored by LATV due to the content of some of the content; however,  and Chuy have been known to speak the truth.

 and Chuy in most shows play a cultural music video, being a Mexican banda or a Puerto Rican orchestra. They really turn up their criticisms on these types of music videos.

Good music videos
 and Chuy absolutely love music videos that feature women in skimpy attire.

Reggaeton is another genre that gets  and Chuy to become heartless with their comments.

Music video interaction
 and Chuy are sometimes seen dancing or skating as the videos play.

Controversy
Sometimes, the program gets into a little trouble by touching issues and/or saying things that may cause a reaction from their audience. In the "Touch My Horroscope" episode, the animated duo called Walter Mercado's hotline, only to find that their future was being gathered from Mercado's crystal balls, in which it was insinuated that it was referring to his genitalia.

Other forms of media
 A  and Chuy DVD is currently in the works.
  and Chuy ringtones, wallpapers, and mobile phone episodes are available through different sources.

References

External links
 

2007 American television series debuts
2008 American television series endings
2000s American adult animated television series
2000s American musical comedy television series
American adult animated comedy television series
American adult animated musical television series